The 2009 Interprovincial Hurling Championship, known as the 2009 M Donnelly Hurling Interprovincial Championship due to the tournament's sponsorship by businessman Martin Donnelly, was the 82nd series of the Interprovincial Championship. The annual hurling championship between the four historic provinces of Ireland was contested by Connacht, Leinster, Munster and Ulster. The championship was won by Leinster.

Participants
The teams involved are:

Results

Interprovincial Championship

Top scorers

Championship

Single game

Sources

 Donegan, Des, The Complete Handbook of Gaelic Games (DBA Publications Limited, 2005).

Railway Cup Hurling Championship
Inter-Provincial Hurling Championship
Hurling